Bus Company Island is a   Local Nature Reserve in Canterbury in Kent. It is owned and managed by Canterbury City Council.

This is important as a reptile monitoring site. It was formerly a watermill, and then a bus park. It is now a meadow and orchard.

Access is by permit only.

References

Local Nature Reserves in Kent